Charles Luke McAlister (born 28 August 1983 in Waitara) is a New Zealand rugby union footballer. He plays at fly-half and at centre. He is the brother of New Zealand women's sevens player Kayla McAlister and son of rugby league footballer Charlie McAlister.

Career

McAlister was born in Waitara, New Zealand, and attended Westlake Boys High School, where he played first five-eighth. He played for Silverdale in the North Harbour premier competition before making his provincial debut for North Harbour in 2002 and Super Rugby debut for the Blues in 2004. He made his international debut for New Zealand aged 21, versus the British and Irish Lions in 2005.

In June 2006, his father, Charlie, resigned his position as head coach of the Manawatu team in the Air New Zealand Cup. Charlie McAlister is a former rugby league footballer, and Luke McAlister lived in the Manchester area from the age of four to 13 while his father played rugby league for Oldham, Castleford and the Sheffield Eagles, during which time Luke was a member of the Manchester United Academy.

Following the announcement of his inclusion in the All Blacks squad for the 2007 Rugby World Cup, it was announced on 23 July 2007 that McAlister would be joining Guinness Premiership side Sale Sharks after the World Cup on a two-year deal. It was also reported that he had turned down offers from both Munster and Toulouse to join Sale.

McAlister played in four of the All Blacks' five matches at the 2007 Rugby World Cup, including the 20–18 quarter-final loss to France, in which he was controversially sent to the sin bin for an obstruction. France converted the resulting penalty, and the sin-binning was cited by many New Zealand fans as one of the reasons why their team lost the match. Over the course of the tournament, McAlister accumulated a total of 17 points.

In 2009 after two seasons with Sale in the Guinness Premiership, McAlister returned to New Zealand, where he re-signed with North Harbour and the Blues, with the intention of regaining his place in the national side. He appeared for the All Blacks as a substitute for Stephen Donald against France in Wellington on 20 June 2009.

From August 2011, McAlister played for Stade Toulousain in France's Top 14 championship.
On his first season with Toulouse, he won the Bouclier de Brennus. He played a crucial role in it, scoring all of his team's points during both semi-final and final.

On 12 May 2017, McAlister left Toulouse to sign for former Top 14 champions Toulon ahead of the 2017–18 season.

References

External links
Sale profile
 

1983 births
Living people
Blues (Super Rugby) players
Expatriate rugby union players in England
Expatriate rugby union players in France
Māori All Blacks players
New Zealand expatriate rugby union players
New Zealand expatriate sportspeople in England
New Zealand expatriate sportspeople in France
New Zealand international rugby union players
New Zealand rugby union players
North Harbour rugby union players
People educated at Westlake Boys High School
Rugby union centres
Rugby union fly-halves
Rugby union players from Waitara, New Zealand
Sale Sharks players
Shimizu Koto Blue Sharks players
Stade Toulousain players
World Rugby Awards winners